Smith Corner is an unincorporated community and census-designated place (CDP) in Blair County, Pennsylvania, United States. It was first listed as a CDP prior to the 2020 census.

The CDP is in southwestern Blair County, in the western part of Freedom Township. It sits at the base of the Allegheny Front in the valley of South Dry Run, an eastward-flowing tributary of the Frankstown Branch Juniata River. Pennsylvania Route 164 passes through the community, leading east  to East Freedom and west  over the Allegheny Front to Portage.

References 

Census-designated places in Blair County, Pennsylvania
Census-designated places in Pennsylvania